Stefan Meusburger (born 28 October 1993) is an Austrian footballer who plays for FC Wacker Innsbruck.

External links
 
 

Austrian footballers
Kapfenberger SV players
FC Gratkorn players
2. Liga (Austria) players
1993 births
Living people
Association football defenders
TSV Hartberg players
FC Wacker Innsbruck (2002) players